Catherine Besterman (born 1908) was a Polish-American children's author. Her book The Quaint and Curious Quest of Johnny Longfoot was a Newbery Honor recipient in 1948.

Biography
Catherine Besterman was born in Warsaw, Poland. During World War II, Besterman escaped from Poland to the United States.

Before her departure from Poland, Besterman had considered adapting a Polish folktale for young readers. After arriving in the US, Besterman elected to do so; her first book, The Quaint and Curious Quest of Johnny Longfoot, was published in 1947. It was named to the Best Books of 1947 list by The Horn Book Magazine, and then was selected as a Newbery Honor title in 1948. 

Besterman published one further novel, a sequel titled The Extraordinary Education of Johnny Longfoot in His Search for the Magic Hat (1949). Both books were illustrated by Warren Chappell.

References

1908 births
Year of death missing
Newbery Honor winners
Polish emigrants to the United States